Opus latericium (Latin for "brick work") is an ancient Roman construction technique in which coarse-laid brickwork is used to face a core of opus caementicium.

Opus reticulatum was the dominant form of wall construction in the Imperial era. In the time of the architectural writer Vitruvius, opus latericium seems to have designated structures built using unfired mud bricks.

See also

References 

Roman construction techniques